Royal Library can mean:

Royal Library of Alexandria - the renowned ancient library of Alexandria
Royal Library, Windsor - the royal library of the Sovereign of the United Kingdom
Danish Royal Library - the national library of Denmark
Royal Library of the Netherlands - the national library of The Netherlands
Bibliothèque Royale de Belgique, Royal Library of Belgium, the national library in Brussels
Swedish Royal Library - the national library of Sweden
Royal Library of Turin - formerly the library of the Kings of Italy
Royal manuscripts, British Library, the old royal collections, given by George III in 1757
Bibliothèque du roi, the predecessor of the Bibliothèque nationale de France